Neuroimaging software is used to study the structure and function of the brain.  To see an NIH Blueprint for Neuroscience Research funded clearinghouse of many of these software applications, as well as hardware, etc. go to the NITRC web site.
 3D Slicer Extensible, free open source multi-purpose software for visualization and analysis. 
 Amira 3D visualization and analysis software 
 Analysis of Functional NeuroImages (AFNI) 
 Analyze developed by the Biomedical Imaging Resource (BIR) at Mayo Clinic. 
 Brain Image Analysis Package
 CamBA 
 Caret  Van Essen Lab, Washington University in St. Louis
 CONN (functional connectivity toolbox) 
Diffusion Imaging in Python (DIPY)
 DL+DiReCT
 EEGLAB
 FMRIB Software Library (FSL)
 FreeSurfer
 Imaris Imaris for Neuroscientists
 ISAS (Ictal-Interictal SPECT Analysis by SPM) 
 LONI Pipeline, Laboratory of Neuro Imaging, USC 
 Mango
 NITRC The Neuroimaging Informatics Tools and Resources Clearinghouse. An NIH funded database of neuroimaging tools 
 NeuroKit, a Python open source toolbox for physiological signal processing
 Neurophysiological Biomarker Toolbox
 PyNets: A Reproducible Workflow for Structural and Functional Connectome Ensemble Learning (PyNets)
 Seed-based d mapping (previously signed differential mapping, SDM): a method for conducting meta-analyses of voxel-based neuroimaging studies.
 The Spinal Cord Toolbox (SCT) is the first comprehensive and open-source software for processing MR images of the spinal cord.
 Statistical parametric mapping (SPM)

References

 
Neuroimaging